Agyneta lila is a species of spider in the family Linyphiidae (sheet weavers), found in Japan. It was described by Dönitz & Strand in 1906.

References

lila
Spiders of Asia
Spiders described in 1906